Place Blanche in Paris, France is one of the small plazas along the Boulevard de Clichy, which runs between the 9th and 18th arrondissements (Parisian districts) and leads into Montmartre. It is near Pigalle.

On 23 May 1871, during the Bloody Week at the end of the Paris Commune, when Versailles troops entered Paris to retake it for the French Third Republic, the Place Blanche was defended by 120 communard women. Among them were Béatrix Excoffon, Elisabeth Dmitrieff, Nathalie Lemel, Blanche Lefebvre, and Malvina Poulain. They held back General Clinchant's troops at a barricade before retreating, exhausted and out of ammunition, to Place Pigalle. Those who could not retreat were executed on the spot, among them Blanche Lefebvre.

The famous cabaret Moulin Rouge stands on the Place Blanche.

During the 1950s, the Place Blanche was a centre of Paris' transsexual community, documented in Christer Strömholm's book Les amies de Place Blanche.

References 

Blanche
Buildings and structures in the 9th arrondissement of Paris
Buildings and structures in the 18th arrondissement of Paris